İstiklal Avenue (English: Independence Avenue) historically known as the Grand Avenue of Pera, in the historic Beyoğlu (Pera) district, is an 1.4 kilometre (0.87 mi) pedestrian street and one of the most famous avenues in Istanbul, Turkey. It acquired its modern name after the declaration of the Republic on 29 October 1923, İstiklal (Independence) commemorating Turkey's triumph in its War of Independence.

The street starts at the northern end of Galata (the medieval Genoese quarter) at Tünel Square and runs as far as Taksim Square. It is flanked by late Ottoman era buildings (mostly from the 19th and early 20th centuries) in a variety of styles including Neo-Classical, Neo-Gothic, Renaissance Revival, Beaux-Arts, Art Nouveau and First Turkish National Architecture. There are also a few Art Deco style buildings from the early years of the Turkish Republic, and a number of more recent examples of modern architecture. Many would once have been apartment blocks but most are now occupied by   boutiques, music stores, art galleries, cinemas, theatres, libraries, cafés, pubs, nightclubs with live music, hotels, historical patisseries, chocolateries, restaurants and a steadily growing number of international chain stores. There is even a branch of Madame Tussauds.

Galatasaray Square marks the middle of the avenue and is home to the oldest secondary school in Turkey: the Galatasaray High School (Galatasaray Lisesi), originally known as the Galata Sarayı Enderun-u Hümayunu (Galata Palace Imperial School). A monument, these days fenced off as a police post, commemorates the fiftieth anniversary of the founding of the Turkish Republic in 1973.

The avenue forms a spine with narrow side streets running off it like a ribcage. Many historical and politically significant buildings can be found on or immediately adjacent to Istiklal Avenue. They include the Çiçek Pasajı (Flower Passage) which is full of lively restaurants and taverns; the Balık Pazarı (The Fish Market) with the Armenian church of Üç Horan to one side; the Hüseyin Ağa Mosque; the Roman Catholic churches of Santa Maria Draperis and S. Antonio di Padova; the Greek Orthodox church of Hagia Triada;  several academic institutions established by Austria, France, Germany and Italy in the 19th century; and the consulates (embassies until 1923 when these moved to the new capital of Ankara) of France, Greece, the Netherlands, Russia, Spain and Sweden (the consulate of the United Kingdom is just off Istiklal Avenue on Meşrutiyet Street).

 

At the southern end of the avenue, it is possible to board the Tünel (the Tunnel), the world's second-oldest subway, which entered service in 1875 and carries passengers down to Karaköy. A photogenic red-and-cream tram runs along the street from Tünel to Taksim Square every 15 minutes.

History 

During the Ottoman period, the avenue was called Cadde-i Kebir (Grand Avenue) in Turkish or the Grande Rue de Péra in French. It was a popular gathering place where Ottoman intellectual rubbed shoulders with Europeans and the local Italian and French Levantines. When 19th-century travelers referred to Constantinople (today Istanbul) as the Paris of the East, they were usually thinking of the Grande Rue de Péra and its cosmopolitan, half-European, half-Asian culture.

On 6–7 September 1955 an anti-Greek Istanbul pogrom resulted in many shops along the avenue being pillaged; its pavements were covered with broken glass, scattered clothing, smashed white goods, burned automobiles and other items that had belonged to the Greek owners of the wrecked shops.

Between the 1950s and 1970s the side streets around the Emek Pasajı were home to Yeşilcam, Turkey's home-grown equivalent of Hollywood, a fact commemorated in the street name Yeşilcam Sokağı.

The avenue fell from grace in the 1970s and 1980s as the old Istanbulite inhabitants moving elsewhere, and the side streets (then infamous for bars and night clubs with live music and shows, called pavyon in Turkish) were repopulated by migrants from rural Anatolia.

During the late 1980s and early 1990s, a revival took place, spearheaded and executed by the Istanbul Metropolitan Municipality and Beyoğlu Municipality. Historic buildings were restored, the street was pedestrianised, and the old historic trams were reinstated, bringing back much of the avenue's old charm and popularity. İstiklal Avenue became the center for fine arts and leisure in Istanbul one again and real estate prices skyrocketed. Numerous new art galleries, bookstores, cafés, pubs, restaurants, shops and hotels were opened in and around the street, and venues around it became the host to many international art festivals, such as the annual Istanbul Film Festival.

Until the mid-2010s, İstiklal Avenue was also a popular venue for all sorts of events such as the Istanbul Pride and International Women's Day parades). Marches, gatherings and protests took place there virtually every day. However, after the Gezi Park protests of 2013 all such gatherings were effectively banned.

On 19 March 2016, an Islamic State suicide bombing on Istiklal Avenue killed five people.

On 13 November 2022, a  bomb explosion on Istiklal Avenue killed 6 people and left 81 injured. Police detained a Syrian woman, Ahlam Albashir, suspected of being a Kurdish insurgent having planted the bomb, in a sweep of 47 arrests.

Notable buildings 

Religious buildings
 Church of Sant'Antonio di Padova
 Hagia Triada Greek Orthodox Church
 Church of Santa Maria Draperis
 Hüseyin Ağa Mosque
Schools
 Galatasaray High School
Historic buildings and residences
 Old Galatasaray Post Office 
 Rumeli Pasajı (Cité Roumelie)
 Hazzopulo Pasajı
 Mısır Apartments
 Casa Botter, one of the finest examples of Art Nouveau architecture in Istanbul
 Grand Pera, home in the past to the Cercle d'Orient and now to Madame Tussauds Istanbul
 Tokatliyan Han, once home to the Grand Tokatliyan Hotel
Food and drink
 Çiçek Pasajı (Cité de Péra), site of the Naum Theatre until 1870
 Lebon Patisserie & Café], a defunct historic pastry shop and café
 Markiz Pastanesi, a renowned historic pâtisserie and chocolaterie
 Narmanlı Han, originally home to the Russian Embassy, later home to artist Aliye Berger, today houses cafés and restaurants
Diplomatic missions
 Dutch Consulate
 French Consulate
 Greek Consulate
 Russian Consulate
 Swedish Consulate
Culture and arts
 Istanbul Cinema Museum
 Yapı Kredi Art Gallery
 Beyoğlu Sanat Galerisi
 Akbank Sanat Galerisi
 SALT Beyoğlu
 Meşher Art Gallery

See also

 Abdi İpekçi Avenue
 Bağdat Avenue
 List of upscale shopping districts

References

External links

 istiklal caddesi / istiklal.caddesi.com
 İstiklalCaddesi.net - A news website of the Avenue

Beyoğlu
Entertainment districts in Turkey
Istanbul pogrom
Pedestrian streets in Turkey
Restaurant districts and streets in Turkey
Shopping districts and streets in Turkey
Streets in Istanbul
Tourist attractions in Istanbul